Koffi Amenan Raymonde Kacou (born 7 January 1987), known as Raymonde Kacou, is an Ivorian professional footballer who plays as a defender for Equatorial Guinean club Malabo Kings FC and the Ivory Coast women's national team. She was part of the Ivorian squad for the 2015 FIFA Women's World Cup.

See also
List of Ivory Coast women's international footballers

References

External links
 
 Profile at FIF 
 

1987 births
Living people
People from Yamoussoukro
Ivorian women's footballers
Women's association football defenders
Malabo Kings players
Ivory Coast women's international footballers
2015 FIFA Women's World Cup players
Ivorian expatriate women's footballers
Ivorian expatriates in Equatorial Guinea
Expatriate women's footballers in Equatorial Guinea